Cvelferija is a geographic region the Croatian part of Syrmia, in eastern Croatia. Villages in the region are Vrbanja, Soljani, Strošinci, Drenovci, Đurići, Račinovci, Gunja, Rajevo Selo, Posavski Podgajci.

The name for the region comes from the German word zwölf or twelve. Specifically, villages were part of the Slavonian Military Frontier in the past, where they were part of the Twelfth Company of the Frontier. At that time this region was bordering the Ottoman Empire, while in the present the region borders Bosnia-Herzegovina (to the south) and Serbia (to the east).

The whole region is administratively located within the Vukovar-Srijem County, on its southern edge.

Every year in one of these villages, the cultural event  (in English: 'Singing Cvelferija') take place. The event is attended by folklore groups from Cvelferija and their guests.

Population

See also
Geography of Croatia

References

Geography of Vukovar-Syrmia County
Syrmia
Regions of Croatia